Iblidae is a family of crustaceans belonging to the order Iblomorpha. There are two genera in the family, each with its own subfamily.

Genera:
 Ibla Leach, 1825
 Neoibla Buckeridge & Newman, 2006

References

Barnacles
Crustacean families